Arlebrook is a village in Gloucestershire, England.

A timber framed house known as the Thatched Cottage was built in the 16th century. Next to it is an 18th-century sheep wash.

References

Villages in Gloucestershire
Stroud District